Alfred Kokot (25 January 1928 – 20 June 1981) was a Polish international footballer who played as a forward.

Biography

Kokot started his career playing with Kresy Chorzów and Bergknappen Chorzów during his youth years, with the latter being during World War Two. His first professional role came with Flota Gdynia after the war, later joining Lechia Gdańsk in 1946. During his time with Lechia, Kokot made 82 appearances in the leagues, playing 128 times and scoring 51 goals in all competitions. During this period he was in the starting eleven which made Lechia's first ever appearance in Poland's top division, a 5–1 defeat to Cracovia. He also made his first, and only appearance for the Poland national team with his sole cap coming against Denmark, scoring the goal for Poland in their 2–1 defeat, becoming Lechia's first player to represent the national team. Kokot left Lechia in 1953, going on to play for Górnik 20 Katowice, make 27 league appearances for Górnik Zabrze, Cracovia, Miedź Legnica, Polonia Tychy, and Linodrut Zabrze. Kokot retired from football aged 38 dying in 1981 at the age of 53.

Personal life

His brother was Henryk Kokot, a footballer who spent his career playing for Lechia Gdańsk.

Kokot is commemorated by a star at the MOSiR Stadium in Gdańsk. The "Avenue of Stars" commemorates the efforts and success of former players and coaches.

References

1928 births
1981 deaths
Lechia Gdańsk players
Górnik Zabrze players
MKS Cracovia (football) players
Miedź Legnica players
Polish footballers
Poland international footballers
Association football forwards